Edmund Burke (1851–1919) was a highly regarded Canadian architect best known for building Toronto's Prince Edward Viaduct or "Bloor Street Viaduct", and Toronto's Robert Simpson store.  He served as the Vice-President, then President of the Ontario Association of Architects.

Personal 
Burke was born in Toronto to parents with ties to building industry:
 father William Burke was a local lumber merchant and builder who founded Burke, Smith & Co in 1850 (ceased operations 1967) that supplied timber to build important structures in Toronto like the Crystal Palace at the Provincial Exhibition Grounds and Gooderham and Worts Distillery))
 mother Sarah Langley was sister to architect Henry Langley, whom Burke later trained with.

Education and training 
Burke attended Jesse Ketchum School, Upper Canada College and Toronto Mechanics' Institute before apprenticing as an architect with his maternal uncle and forming the firm Langley and Burke in 1873.

Later life and death 
Most of Burke's professional career was in Toronto and he lived a little more than a decade after his uncle's death. Burke died in the city and is buried at Mount Pleasant Cemetery, where he designed the mortuary chapel in 1893.

Works

References 

1851 births
1919 deaths
Canadian architects
Upper Canada College alumni
Members of the Royal Canadian Academy of Arts